Canadian Pacific Railway No. 972 is a preserved D-10j class 4-6-0 "Ten-wheeler" type steam locomotive built by the Montreal Locomotive Works in 1912. It was used for pulling branchline and mainline freight trains for the Canadian Pacific Railway, until it was removed from service in 1959. It eventually became famous for pulling multiple mainline excursion trains throughout the state of Pennsylvania under the ownership of George Hart. It was sold to the Strasburg Rail Road in 1995, who had an initial plan to rebuild it to pull their own tourist trains. As of 2023, however, No. 972 is stored outdoors and disassembled in the Strasburg Rail Road's yard.

History

Revenue service (1912–1959) 
In the early 20th Century, the Canadian Pacific Railway (CPR) purchased several classes of 4-6-0 "tenwheelers" for their locomotive fleet. No. 972 was the eleventh member of the D-10j class, which consisted of twenty-five locomotives constructed in 1912 by the Montreal Locomotive Works in Montreal, Quebec, and they were numbered 962–986. The CPR assigned No. 972 to pull short-distance freight trains over their light-weight branchlines. During selective years, the locomotive would also pull short freight trains on the CPR's mainline throughout Saskatchewan. By the late 1950s, few of the aging 4-6-0s were still in service for the CPR. No. 972 was retired from revenue service by the end of 1959, and it was subsequently stored in front of the Weston shops with several other steam locomotives in the form of a scrap line.

Rail Tours (1966–1995) 
In early 1966, No. 972 became the last steam locomotive to be sold by the CPR. Steam locomotive historian and former Reading Company employee George M. Hart purchased it with the hopes of using it to pull his own mainline excursion trains under his private company Rail Tours Incorporated. The locomotive was moved to York, Pennsylvania to be refurbished, and later that same year, it was brought back under steam, and it began pulling excursion trains over the Maryland and Pennsylvania Railroad (MPA) between York and Delta. On some occasions in 1966 and 1967, the locomotive assisted CPR 4-6-2 No. 1286, another locomotive formerly operated by Hart, on a series of roundtrip excursion runs on the Western Maryland (WM) mainline between York, Williamsport, Hagerstown, and Cumberland.

In 1967, Hart moved most of his equipment, including No. 972, to Jim Thorpe, and he reached an agreement with the city of Jim Thorpe to operate excursion trains there. No. 972 subsequently began pulling trains over the Central Railroad of New Jersey's (CNJ) Nesquehoning Valley branch, as well as on the Lehigh Valley's (LV) mainline from Jim Thorpe to White Haven and return, and several other trains that took place in the state of Pennsylvania. In 1971, No. 972 visited the Strasburg Rail Road in Strasburg to promote the future opening of the Railroad Museum of Pennsylvania. On October 25, 1975, No. 972 led a double-headed excursion train in front of Ex-Florida East Coast (FEC) 4-6-2 No. 148 from Bethlehem to South Plainfield, New Jersey. That trip was a "Farewell to the Lehigh Valley" trip, since the LV was to be merged into Conrail the following year. However, that trip was also plagued by the poor condition of the trackage they rode on, and rain was downpouring across the states of Pennsylvania and New Jersey that day.

No. 972 subsequently returned to Jim Thorpe to continue pulling excursion trains throughout Carbon County. The locomotive returned to the Strasburg Rail Road to pull a tourist train for the National Railway Historical Society (NRHS) in March 1979. In October 1983, during the 150th anniversary of the founding of the Reading Company, No. 972 was relettered to 'Philadelphia and Reading', and it was selected to pull an excursion train in commemoration of the occasion, since none of the preserved Reading steam locomotives were available at the time. After Andrew Muller founded the Blue Mountain and Reading Railroad (BM&R), No. 972 began pulling trains out of Reading. In 1985, No. 972 was relettered again to 'Cumberland Valley' to pull commemorative trains for the 150th anniversary of the founding of the Cumberland Valley Railroad (CV). By the end of that year, however, the locomotive was removed from excursion service, since Hart's contract with the city of Jim Thorpe expired. While making negotiations with the city to renew his contract, Hart moved No. 972 back to Strasburg for a heavy rebuild.

Disposition (1995–present) 

By the mid-1990s, Rail Tours had been facing some financial trouble, and they could no longer afford to pull steam-powered excursion trains. As a result of this, Hart had gave up on steam locomotive preservation, and he sold off all of his equipment. Since No. 972 was stored on Strasburg property for a rebuild that hadn't been paid for, the locomotive was sold to the Strasburg Rail Road as a compensation. With the locomotive now under their possession, the Strasburg Rail Road made plans to masquerade No. 972 as a Pennsylvania Railroad (PRR) G5, in order to fill in for their recently-retired PRR locomotives 1223 and 7002. This masquerade was to include replacing its firebox with a Belpaire one and moving its headlight to the top of the smokebox door. As time progressed, however, the Strasburg Rail Road had already rostered five operational steam locomotives, which was more than their crews could handle at the same time, and No. 972's rebuild was cancelled as a result. As of 2023, No. 972 is stored outdoors in the Strasburg Rail Road's yard with its cab, firebox, pilot truck, cowcatcher, smokebox door, and several other critical components detached. As a result of being used to pull heavy passenger trains with little overhauls along the way, the locomotive is going to require a complete rebuild with multiple replacement components in order to operate again.

See also 

 Canadian Pacific 1238
 Canadian Pacific 1286
 Canadian Pacific 1293
 Reading 1251
 Reading Blue Mountain and Northern Railroad 425

Bibliography

References 

MLW locomotives
4-6-0 locomotives
972
Steam locomotives of the United States
Individual locomotives of Canada
Preserved steam locomotives of Canada
Railway locomotives introduced in 1912
Standard gauge locomotives of the United States
Standard gauge locomotives of Canada
Preserved steam locomotives of Pennsylvania